Patrick Keaveney (28 October 1929 – 19 July 1995) was an Irish politician and businessman from County Donegal. He was a cooperative manager and a member of the Independent Fianna Fáil party, and was a Teachta Dála (TD) for one year.

He was elected to the 20th Dáil as TD for Donegal North-East at a by-election in June 1976 caused by the death of Fianna Fáil TD Liam Cunningham. His surprise victory gave Independent Fianna Fáil two out of the three seats in Donegal North-East, but the constituency was abolished for the 1977 general election, when he was defeated in the new Donegal constituency. He did not stand again.

Keaveney was later elected to Donegal County Council, and after his death in 1995, his daughter Cecilia was co-opted to take his place as councillor. The following year, she was elected to Dáil Éireann as the Fianna Fáil candidate in a by-election following the death of Independent Fianna Fáil's founder Neil Blaney.

References

1929 births
1995 deaths
Politicians from County Donegal
Members of the 20th Dáil
Independent Fianna Fáil TDs
Local councillors in County Donegal